Krista Guloien (born March 20, 1980, in New Westminster, British Columbia) is a Canadian rower from Port Moody, British Columbia.

At the 2008 Summer Olympics, she competed in the women's quad sculls.

At the 2012 Summer Olympics, she was part of the Canadian women's eight that won the silver medal.

She studied criminology at Simon Fraser University.

References

1980 births
Sportspeople from British Columbia
Living people
Olympic rowers of Canada
People from New Westminster
Rowers at the 2008 Summer Olympics
Rowers at the 2012 Summer Olympics
Olympic silver medalists for Canada
Olympic medalists in rowing
Canadian female rowers
Medalists at the 2012 Summer Olympics
Simon Fraser University alumni
World Rowing Championships medalists for Canada
21st-century Canadian women